Antonio Pandella (died 1538) was a Roman Catholic prelate who served as Bishop of Lesina (1528–1538).

Biography
On 11 December 1528, Antonio Pandella was appointed during the papacy of Pope Clement VII as Bishop of Lesina.
He served as Bishop of Lesina until his death in 1538.

References 

16th-century Italian Roman Catholic bishops
Bishops appointed by Pope Clement VII
1538 deaths